The men's 200 metres at the 2002 European Athletics Championships were held at the Olympic Stadium on August 8–9.

Medalists

Results

Heats
Qualification: First 4 of each heat (Q) and the next 4 fastest (q) qualified for the quarterfinals.

Wind:Heat 1: +0.8 m/s, Heat 2: -0.2 m/s, Heat 3: +0.1 m/s, Heat 4: +0.8 m/s, Heat 5: +0.1 m/s

Quarterfinals
Qualification: First 4 of each heat (Q) and the next 4 fastest (q) qualified for the semifinals.

Wind:Heat 1: -1.8 m/s, Heat 2: -0.8 m/s, Heat 3: -0.3 m/s

Semifinals
Qualification: First 4 of each semifinal (Q) qualified directly for the final.

Wind:Heat 1: -0.5 m/s, Heat 2: +0.2 m/s

Final
Wind: -0.5 m/s

External links

Events at the 2002 European Athletics Championships
200 metres at the European Athletics Championships